This is a complete list of the Nickelodeon CGI interactive animated series, Wallykazam!. The series was produced by Nickelodeon.

Series overview

Episodes

Season 1 (2014–15)

Season 2 (2015–17)

References

Wallykazam! episodes list of
Wallykazam!